Ante Grgurević (born August 13, 1975) is a Croatian professional basketball coach and former player. 

Standing at 2.00 m (6 ft  in) he played the power forward, and also the small forward and center positions if needed.

Coaching career

Split (2012–2019)
After he finished his career, Grgurević started coaching career as an assistant coach of Split in the Croatian League, in September 2012. On March 6, 2019, Grgurević was named the head coach of Split, after head coach Vladimir Anzulović was sacked due to poor results. On June 24, 2019, the club announced that Grgurević signed a two-year deal. On December 8, 2019, he was sacked.

References

External links
Euroleague.net Profile
Adriatic League Profile
Eurobasket.lt Profile
Basketpedya.com Profile

1975 births
Living people
Croatian men's basketball players
KK Split players
Aris B.C. players
AEK B.C. players
Olympia Larissa B.C. players
Power forwards (basketball)
Small forwards
Centers (basketball)